Sir James Sibbald David Scott, 3rd Baronet (1814–1885) of Dunninald Castle, Forfarshire, was a Scottish antiquarian and army officer.

Life
Born on 14 June 1814, he was eldest son of Sir David Scott, 2nd Baronet of Egham; his mother was Caroline, daughter of Benjamin Grindall. He graduated B.A. in 1835 from Christ Church, Oxford, and was a captain in the Royal Sussex Light Infantry Militia and its offshoot, the Royal Sussex Militia Artillery, from 21 April 1846 to 22 January 1856. He succeeded to the baronetcy in 1851, and was J.P. and D.L. for Sussex and Middlesex. He was a fellow of the Society of Antiquaries of London, and a member of the Royal Archæological Institute.

Scott died on 28 June 1885 at Upper Norwood.

Works
Scott's major work was The British Army: its Origin, Progress, and Equipment, illustrated. The first two volumes were published in 1868, and a third volume in 1880, bringing down the record from the 1660 to 1688. He contributed to the journal of the Royal Archæological Institute.

In the summer of 1874 Scott paid a short visit to Jamaica, and his diary was published in 1876 under the title To Jamaica and Back. It contains a sketch of the military and naval history of the island, and describes in some detail the Morant Bay rebellion of 1865.

Family
Scott married Harriet Anne Shank on 28 November 1844. They had three sons and four daughters.

Notes

 
Attribution
 

1814 births
1885 deaths
Scottish antiquarians
Fellows of the Society of Antiquaries of London
Baronets in the Baronetage of the United Kingdom
Scottish diarists
Sussex Militia officers
19th-century diarists